Pokrovskoye is a village, it is an administrative center of the Neklinovsky District of Rostov Oblast in Russia. It is  also an administrative center of the rural population of Pokrovskoye. Its population is 12369 as of 2010.

History
It was founded in 1769.

The first record about the community, where the village Pokrovskoye is placed now, was made in 1769. A Ukrainian historian Dmytro Yavornytsky (pen name: Evarnitsky) mentions in his “History of the Zaporozhian Cossacks:"

Translation:

In the year 1915 in Pokrovskoye existed 1410 yards, in the bylaw of the peasant citizens were standing 12400 dessiatins (approx. 136 km2) of land.

Geography

The village lies along the river Mius, 3 kilometers south-west to the railroad station Neklinovka.
The distance to the city Taganrog adds up to 20 kilometers, to the city Rostov-on-Don it adds up to 65 kilometers.

Economy

Industry

Milk factory, meat workshop, brick factory, agricultural enterprises are present.
There are deposits of clay, sand, gas etc.

Agriculture

In the region corn, barley, maize, sunflower, vegetables and fruits are being grown. 
Cattle, pigs and birds are being bred.

Transportation

The village is connected with the city Taganrog and Rostov-on-Don by the rail road and bus trafficking. There are also transit busses which stop in Pokrovskoye on their ways to Donetsk, Ilovaisk and Khartsyzk.

Some route busses, the schedule of which is adapted to the departures and arrivals of the trains of the sector “ - Taganrog”, circulate through the village.

References

Rural localities in Rostov Oblast
Populated places established in 1769